Barsness Lake is a lake in Douglas County, in the U.S. state of Minnesota.

History
Barsness Lake was named for Albert and Oscar Barsness.

See also
List of lakes in Minnesota

References

Lakes of Minnesota
Lakes of Douglas County, Minnesota